The Works and Days (of Tayoko Shiojiri in the Shiotani Basin) is a 2020 fiction film directed by C.W. Winter and Anders Edström. It describes life in a farming village, population 47, in the Shiotani basin in the Japanese prefecture of Kyoto. It is the second feature-length collaboration between C.W. Winter and Anders Edström after their 2009 film, The Anchorage.

Plot 
The film, which takes its title from Hesiod's Ancient Greek farmer's almanac Works and Days, is presented in five chapters as it examines the daily routine of Tayoko, an elderly woman and farmer who lives in Shiotani. The film follows Tayoko as she cares for and prepares to mourn her husband, Junji, and features excerpts read from Tayoko's real life diaries.

Cast 

 Tayoko Shiojiri as Tayoko
 Hiroharu Shikata as Hiroharu
 Ryo Kase as Ryo Sasaki
 Mai Edström as Mai
 Kaoru Iwahana as Junji
 Jun Tsunoda as Kagawa
 Masahiro Motoki as NPC

Production 
The film was inspired by a series of conversations between Winter, Edström, and Tayoko, who is Edström's real life mother-in-law. It was shot for a total of 27 weeks, across a 14-month period. At 480 minutes long, it is one of the longest films ever made.

Release 
The film had its world premiere at the 2020 Berlin International Film Festival where it won the Encounters Golden Bear for Best Film.  It had its U.S. theatrical release on July 16, 2021 and its French theatrical release on June 22, 2022.

Critical response 
The film received critical acclaim. Mark Peranson for Cinema Scope called the film "an utterly confident, magisterial effort that will stand the test of time." In La Internacional Cinéfila, Agnès Wildenstein called it, "The best movie of the year. A tremendous cinematic pleasure. And a film that will remain in the history of cinema." Jordan Cronk, writing for Artforum, described the film as a "comprehensive look at a vanishing way of life...uncommonly poignant and profound." Writing for Le Monde, Clarise Fabré called the film "a masterpiece." 

In addition to the Berlinale prize, the film won Best Independent/Experimental Film of the Year from the Los Angeles Film Critics Association. It also won Best Film prizes at the Punto de Vista and Black Canvas film festivals. The film made dozens of end of the year Ten Best lists.

References

External links 

 The Works and Days official site
 The Works and Days at IMDb

2020 films